Teton County Courthouse may refer to:

Teton County Courthouse (Idaho), Driggs, Idaho
Teton County Courthouse (Montana), Choteau, Montana